The Razi Hospital Kukherd  in Kukherd District (from , in ), is a general hospital located in the Kukherd City, Iran. It serves an estimated 1,000 patients per year.  The hospital has, because of the beauty of their decoration, been a major attraction for visitors of Kukherd District city and the capital District, in Bastak County, Hormozgan Province, Southern Iran.

History
The hospital was built in 1996.  It situated to the west of the Kukherd city. The Hospital first opened in March 2001.  The main building of Razi Hospital Kukherd is located on the Mean Street in the Kukherd District, Bastak County, Hormozgan Province, Iran

See also 
Bastak 
Paraw Kukherd 
The Historic Bath of Siba 
Castle of Siba

References 

 :ar: مستشفى الرازي (كوخرد) Arabic Wikipedias.
 :fa: Persian Wikipedia.
	الكوخردى ، محمد ، بن يوسف، (كُوخِرد حَاضِرَة اِسلامِيةَ عَلي ضِفافِ نَهر مِهران) الطبعة الثالثة ،دبى: سنة 199۷ للميلاد **Mohammed Kookherdi (1997) Kookherd, an Islamic civil at Mehran river,  third edition: Dubai
	محمدیان، کوخری، محمد ، “ (به یاد کوخرد) “، ج1. ج2. چاپ اول، دبی: سال انتشار 2003 میلادی Mohammed Kookherdi Mohammadyan (2003), Beyade Kookherd, third edition : Dubai.
محمدیان، کوخردی ، محمد ،  «شهرستان بستک و بخش کوخرد»  ، ج۱. چاپ اول، دبی: سال انتشار ۲۰۰۵ میلادی Mohammed Kookherdi Mohammadyan (2005), Shahrestan  Bastak & Bakhshe Kookherd, First edition : Dubai.
عباسی ، قلی، مصطفی،  «بستک وجهانگیریه»، چاپ اول، تهران : ناشر: شرکت انتشارات جهان
   سلامى، بستكى، احمد.  (بستک در گذرگاه تاریخ)  ج2 چاپ اول، 1372 خورشيدى
 اطلس گیتاشناسی استان‌های ایران [Atlas Gitashenasi Ostanhai Iran] (Gitashenasi Province Atlas of Iran)

External links 
 Kookherd website

Kukherd District
Bastak County
Hospitals in Iran
Hospitals established in 2001
Buildings and structures in Kukherd District